Epyaxa rosearia, the New Zealand looper or plantain moth, is a moth of the family Geometridae.It is endemic to New Zealand.

Taxonomy
E. rosearia was first described by Edward Doubleday in 1843 and named Cidaria rosearia.

Description
The eggs of this species are pale yellow and oval with a smooth shell.

Alex Purdie describes the caterpillar of this species as:
 The caterpillars form a chrysalis that is glossy and very dark brownish black. They can be found amongst the leaves of the forest floor. E. rosearia adults are varied in appearance. They can have a pinkish tinge or can be brownish in hue although olive green is also common.

Distribution 
E. rosearia are very common throughout New Zealand.

Host species 
While it is endemic to New Zealand, the larvae have so far only been recorded feeding on exotic plant species: Nasturtium officinale, Plantago lanceolata, Trifolium ambiguum, Trifolium repens and Tropaeolum majus. The larvae also seem to feed on the leaves of Trifolium caucasicum.

Interaction with humans 
A recent study suggests this moth may be assisting with the pollination of avocado trees.

References 

Xanthorhoini
Moths of New Zealand
Endemic fauna of New Zealand
Moths described in 1843
Taxa named by Edward Doubleday
Endemic moths of New Zealand